Liudvikas Povilonis (Liudas Povilionis) (August 25, 1910- August 2, 1990) was a Lithuanian priest, archbishop, Apostolic Administrator of Roman Catholic Archdiocese of Kaunas (1979-1988), bishop of the Roman Catholic Diocese of Panevėžys (1983-1984), archbishop of the Roman Catholic Diocese of Vilkaviškis (1979-1988), Auxiliary of the Apostolic Administrator of Kaunas Archdiocese and Vilkaviškis Diocese (1973–1979).

He was buried at the  cemetery of Marijampolė Basilica.

References

1910 births
1990 deaths